Ananyevskaya is a rural locality (a village) in Gorodishchenskoye Rural Settlement, Nyuksensky District, Vologda Oblast, Russia. The population was 20 as of 2002.

Geography 
Ananyevskaya is located 41 km southeast of Nyuksenitsa (the district's administrative centre) by road. Yushkovo is the nearest rural locality.

References 

Rural localities in Nyuksensky District